Brett Butler (born April 10, 1985) is an American NASCAR driver who most recently ran in the Camping World Truck Series. He is the younger brother of driver Ken Butler III, and the son of Aaron's, Inc. president Ken Butler.

Early career
Butler graduated from Parkview High School where he was a star wrestler. At the age of 15, he started his racing career by running go-karts along with his brother Ken. In 2003 and 2004, he ran in the Aaron's Pro Challenge series, accumulating 22 top-10s and two poles. For 2005, Butler ran part-time in the Dodge Weekly Racing Series at Hickory Motor Speedway. He earned three top-10s and finished 12th in points.

Driver development program
Around this time, Butler signed with Michael Waltrip Racing as part of their driver development program. In 2006, he began running in the Hooters USAR Pro Cup Series. He ran the entire season in their Southern Division and finished 21st in points with 1 top-10. He finished 2nd in both Rookie of the Year and Most Popular Driver Standings. In 2007, he ran selected Pro Cup races and also made his ARCA series debut by running 2 races with Aaron's sponsorship. In 2008, Brett returned to running full-time in Pro Cup, this time in their Northern Division.

Camping World Truck Series
In 2009, Butler made his debut in the Truck Series at Martinsville Speedway in March, driving the No. 47 Chevrolet for Fast Track Racing Enterprises. He started in the 36th position and finished 26th. He would run 3 more races that season with a best finish of 20th at Martinsville in October in a No. 99 Chevrolet owned by Dwayne Tatman.

For 2010, Brett was tabbed by Rick Ware Racing to drive the full season for their newly created Truck Series team in the No. 47 Fuel Doctor Chevrolet. At Daytona International Speedway, in his first race with the team, Butler earned rookie of the race honors by finishing 11th and leading one lap. This would be the high point for Butler's season with him only garnering two more top-20 finishes over the next 13 races. After the August race at Nashville Superspeedway, Butler was removed from the No. 47. He ran the next race at Darlington Raceway in the No. 6 Chevrolet, parking after just 19 laps. This would be his last appearance of the 2010 season.

Return to NASCAR
In 2013 Butler returned to NASCAR competition, driving for SR² Motorsports in the Nationwide Series part-time.

Motorsports career results

NASCAR
(key) (Bold – Pole position awarded by qualifying time. Italics – Pole position earned by points standings or practice time. * – Most laps led.)

Nationwide Series

Camping World Truck Series

 Season still in progress
 Ineligible for series points

References

External links
 

Living people
1985 births
People from Lilburn, Georgia
Sportspeople from the Atlanta metropolitan area
Racing drivers from Atlanta
Racing drivers from Georgia (U.S. state)
NASCAR drivers